Caloptilia galacotra is a moth of the family Gracillariidae. It is known from the Galápagos Islands.

References

galacotra
Gracillariidae of South America
Moths described in 2006